"Burn It to the Ground" is the fourth U.S. single (fifth single in Canada after "I'd Come for You") released from Canadian rock band Nickelback's sixth studio album Dark Horse. The song has been used extensively for various promotional uses, in television, film and mainly sports-related promos.

Background and composition
Frontman Chad Kroeger describes the song as being about drinking "everything in sight." The song is an arena anthem, and a live staple of the band's Dark Horse World Tour, where Kroeger usually began the song by stating "this song is the theme song of my life."

Reception
The song was nominated for Best Hard Rock Performance for the 52nd Grammy Awards, but lost to AC/DC.

On February 28, 2010, Nickelback performed the song at the closing ceremony of the 2010 Winter Olympics in Vancouver. The performance helped the song to reach number 2 on Canada's iTunes while the album reached also number 2 in the top albums category almost a year and a half after its release.

"Burn It to the Ground" became the highest-charting single by Nickelback in Finland and only the second Nickelback single to enter the Finnish Singles Chart, peaking at number 7. Their first entry was "How You Remind Me", which was released eight years earlier (the song peaked at number 18).

Music video
The video premiered on July 10, 2009. The video features the band on stage at the O2 Arena in London performing the song. The crowd shots are a mix of all of their Dark Horse Tour shows in the United Kingdom.

Live performances
Nickelback played the song on Jimmy Kimmel Live! with "When We Stand Together" in 2011. In December 2011, they performed the song as part of the 2011 WWE Tribute to the Troops.

Promotional use
It is featured on the soundtrack for Transformers: Revenge of the Fallen, and can be heard in the background during a party scene in the film. An instrumental version of the song was played when the Kansas City Royals' starting line-up was introduced during home games in 2009.  The song was also used by the 2009 Colorado Rockies, and 2010 Baltimore Orioles as the players took the field. The song is also featured in video game NHL 10, and was used as the theme song for WWE Raw from November 16, 2009, until July 16, 2012, and was used in late 2017 for promoting Raw 25, the show's 25th anniversary episode for January 22, 2018. It was also featured in Jersey Shore'''s second season.

The song was featured for Norfolk Southern Railway 21st Century Steam Program, starting in 2014 and running until 2017.

The song is also the touchdown song for the NFL's Cincinnati Bengals and Dallas Cowboys, the goal song for the NHL's New York Islanders and the AHL's Peoria Rivermen and the GOJHL's LaSalle Vipers, the start of the song plays before the opening faceoff for the Chicago Blackhawks and also the entrance theme for the AHL's Abbotsford Heat and was the entrance theme of Jonny Gomes of the Cincinnati Reds.

The song is also featured in the trailer for the 2010 film Date Night, it was also used for the presenter entrance for the Top Gear Live show. The song has also been used sporadically for the WHL's Kelowna Rockets and the SJHL's Flin Flon Bombers. An instrumental version of the song is used whenever the Boston Blazers have a Power Play opportunity. The song is also played in Speed Channel's ad for NASCAR Sprint All-Star Race XXVI.

It was also used in the Formula One highlights for the 2010 Australian Grand Prix, as well as for the 2010 NASCAR commercials.

The instrumental version of the song was used to introduce the players of Team Staal led by Eric Staal at the 2011 NHL All-Star Game.

The song was featured as a playable track part of the Nickelback downloadable track pack for the video game Rock Band''.

The song debuted on August 14, 2010 as the new introduction song for the Seattle Seahawks.

Track listing
"Clean Edit" - 3:29
"Album Version" - 3:30

Charts

Weekly charts

Year-end charts

Certifications

References

2009 singles
Nickelback songs
Songs written by Chad Kroeger
WWE Raw
Songs about alcohol
Song recordings produced by Robert John "Mutt" Lange
Song recordings produced by Joey Moi
2008 songs
Roadrunner Records singles
Stoner rock songs
Songs written by Joey Moi
Songs written by Mike Kroeger
Alternative metal songs